Oshae Jahve Brissett (born June 20, 1998) is a Canadian professional basketball player for the Indiana Pacers of the National Basketball Association (NBA). He played college basketball for the Syracuse Orange.

Early life
Brissett was born in Toronto to mother McKeitha McFarlane and father Bernard Brissett, who had separated around the time of his birth. He is of Jamaican descent. Brissett spent the first four years of his life living in the Jane and Finch neighbourhood before moving to Mississauga. After initially attending high school at St. Aloysius Gonzaga Secondary School in Mississauga, Brissett moved away from home to attend Findlay Prep in Henderson, Nevada in order to hone his skills against better competition and to improve his chances of recruitment by a major college. After Findlay Prep, Brissett returned to Canada and spent a year at the Athlete Institute in Mono, Ontario, where he excelled as team captain.

College career
Brissett committed to Syracuse after receiving offers from USC, Oregon, and Memphis. He entered the Orange starting lineup immediately, providing an interior presence alongside guards Tyus Battle and Frank Howard. Brissett averaged 14.9 points and 8.8 rebounds per game in his first collegiate season.

Following Brissett's freshman season, there was speculation that he could test the waters in the 2018 NBA Draft. However, he announced his intention to return to Syracuse for his sophomore season on April 11, 2018. As a sophomore, Brissett averaged 12.4 points and 7.5 rebounds per game. After the season, he declared his eligibility for the NBA Draft and forfeited his remaining two years of collegiate eligibility. However, Brissett was not drafted.

Professional career

Toronto Raptors (2019–2020)
On July 23, 2019, Brissett signed with the Toronto Raptors of the National Basketball Association. On October 21, Brissett’s contract was converted to a two-way contract. Under the terms of the deal, he would split time between the Raptors and their NBA G League affiliate, the Raptors 905. He made his NBA debut on November 19 against the Miami Heat. On January 7, 2020, Brissett played his best game of the season, scoring a then-career high 12 points and grabbing six rebounds, one assist, and one steal in a 101–99 loss against the Portland Trail Blazers. In the G League, Brissett averaged 15.1 points and 6.6 rebounds per game. Following the season, the Raptors extended a qualifying offer to him, making him a restricted free agent. He later signed a partially guaranteed, two-year contract extension. Brissett was waived by the team at the end of training camp preceding the 2020–21 season.

Fort Wayne Mad Ants (2021)
Brissett was selected 21st overall in the first 2021 NBA G League draft by the Fort Wayne Mad Ants and was later included in the single-site season roster announced on January 11, 2021. He played in 12 games and averaged 18.6 points, 9.8 rebounds, and 2.3 assists in 34.6 minutes, earning a spot in the All-NBA G League Second Team.

Indiana Pacers (2021–present)
On April 1, 2021, Brissett signed a 10-day contract with the Indiana Pacers of the NBA. Ten days later, he signed a second 10-day contract. 

On April 20, 2021, Brissett made his first career start in a 109–94 loss to the San Antonio Spurs, scoring 13 points on 5-of-8 shooting from the field and 3-of-5 from three, along with six rebounds and a steal. The next day, he signed a three year deal with the team and started that night's game against the Oklahoma City Thunder scoring 23 points, grabbing 12 rebounds, and recording 3 blocks. On May 18, 2021, Brissett scored 23 points with five rebounds and two assists in a 144–117 play-in win over the Charlotte Hornets.

National team career
On May 24, 2022, Brissett agreed to a three-year commitment to play with the Canadian senior men's national team.

Career statistics

NBA

Regular season

|-
| style="text-align:left;"|
| style="text-align:left;"|Toronto
| 19 || 0 || 7.1 || .361 || .200 || .800 || 1.4 || .4 || .2 || .1 || 1.9
|-
| style="text-align:left;"|
| style="text-align:left;"|Indiana
| 21 || 16 || 24.7 || .483 || .423 || .769 || 5.5 || .9 || .9 || 1.0 || 10.9
|-
| style="text-align:left;"|
| style="text-align:left;"|Indiana
| 67 || 25 || 23.3 || .411 || .350 || .695 || 5.3 || 1.1 || .7 || .4 || 9.1
|- class="sortbottom"
| style="text-align:center;" colspan="2"|Career
| 107 || 41 || 20.7 || .424 || .361 || .720 || 4.7 || .9  || .6 || .5 || 8.2

College

|-
| style="text-align:left;"| 2017–18
| style="text-align:left;"| Syracuse
| 37 || 37 || 38.1 || .354 || .331 || .787 || 8.8 || .9 || 1.2 || .8 || 14.9
|-
| style="text-align:left;"| 2018–19
| style="text-align:left;"| Syracuse
| 34 || 34 || 33.0 || .393 || .270 || .660 || 7.5 || 1.8 || 1.0 || .8 || 12.4
|- class="sortbottom"
| style="text-align:center;" colspan="2"| Career
| 71 || 71 || 35.7 || .371 || .307 || .736 || 8.2 || 1.3 || 1.1 || .8 || 13.7

Personal life
Brissett has an older brother named Dejon who was drafted second overall in the 2020 CFL Draft by the Toronto Argonauts.

References

External links
Oshae Brissett at Basketball-Reference.com
Oshae Brissett at NBA.com
Oshae Brissett at ESPN.com
Oshae Brissett at NBA G League
Oshae Brissett at Syracuse Orange

1998 births
Living people
Basketball players from Toronto
Black Canadian basketball players
Canadian expatriate basketball people in the United States
Canadian men's basketball players
Canadian sportspeople of Jamaican descent
Findlay Prep alumni
Fort Wayne Mad Ants players
Indiana Pacers players
National Basketball Association players from Canada
Raptors 905 players
Shooting guards
Small forwards
Syracuse Orange men's basketball players
Toronto Raptors players
Undrafted National Basketball Association players